The Winslow–Turner Carriage House was a historic carriage house located at Plattsburgh in Clinton County, New York.  It was built about 1876 and was a 2-story rectangular building on a stone foundation with a -story north wing.  The residence it was associated with was demolished in 1977.  The carriage house itself was allowed to fall into extreme disrepair and was torn down by its owner in 2020.

It had been listed on the National Register of Historic Places in 1982.

References

Transportation buildings and structures on the National Register of Historic Places in New York (state)
Houses completed in 1876
Houses in Clinton County, New York
National Register of Historic Places in Clinton County, New York
Carriage houses on the National Register of Historic Places